Undercover Brother is a 2002 American satirical spy action comedy blaxploitation film directed by Malcolm D. Lee and starring Eddie Griffin. The screenplay by John Ridley and Michael McCullers is based on the Internet animated series created by Ridley. It spoofs blaxploitation films of the 1970s as well as a number of other films, most notably the James Bond franchise. It also stars former Saturday Night Live cast member Chris Kattan and comedian Dave Chappelle as well as Aunjanue Ellis, Neil Patrick Harris, Denise Richards, and Billy Dee Williams, and features a cameo by James Brown.

Plot 
The film begins with a backstory of how African-American culture's popularity with the American public began to decline in the 1980s, when style and originality began to lose appeal in the public eye due to the persistent efforts of "The Man", a powerful Caucasian man in control of a secret organization that seeks to undermine the African-American community as well as the cultures of other minorities. The Man is infuriated that Gen. Warren Boutwell, a United States Army general (based on Colin Powell), is considering running for president, and his lackey Mr. Feather informs him of a mind-control drug which The Man uses to make Boutwell abort his plans and instead open a fried chicken franchise. The B.R.O.T.H.E.R.H.O.O.D., a secret organization that battles The Man's influence, determines The Man is behind Boutwell's change of heart, and recruits a freelance spy named Undercover Brother to aid them.

Undercover Brother joins B.R.O.T.H.E.R.H.O.O.D. which is made up of the Chief, Conspiracy Brother, Smart Brother, Sistah Girl, and Lance, an intern who is the only white man in the organization hired due to affirmative action. Undercover Brother goes undercover as a new employee at a cigarette company owned by The Man, where Mr. Feather discovers his identity. He deploys a secret weapon that he calls "Black Man's Kryptonite", an attractive assassin named White She-Devil. Posing as another new employee, she and Undercover Brother start dating, and she begins to make him do stereotypical "white" things, such as buying corduroy and khaki clothes, singing karaoke, and adopting a silly set of euphemisms. Meanwhile, The Man distributes his mind-control drug through Boutwell's fried chicken, infecting other black celebrities and making them act white, as well as marketing the chicken nationwide to land a crushing blow to African-American culture.

Concerned with Undercover Brother's unusual behavior, Sistah Girl attacks White She-Devil and convinces Undercover Brother to return to the fight. White She-Devil turns on her own henchmen to save the two, revealing she has fallen in love with Undercover Brother. They return to the B.R.O.T.H.E.R.H.O.O.D., where Smart Brother questions White She-Devil about The Man and Lance is officially made part of the group when he declares his desire to abolish bigotry after watching Roots. The group heads to an awards gala after they find out that James Brown is The Man's next target. Mr. Feather kidnaps Brown and takes him to The Man's base. B.R.O.T.H.E.R.H.O.O.D. secures an antidote for the mind control drug and follows via a transmitter placed on Brown, infiltrating the base posing as a cleaning crew, to rescue Brown and Boutwell.

Mr. Feather prepares to administer the drug to Brown and present him as a trophy to The Man, and Brown reveals himself as Undercover Brother in disguise. Mr. Feather sends his henchmen after B.R.O.T.H.E.R.H.O.O.D., who rescue Boutwell, and is ordered by Mr. Feather to kill Undercover Brother. In the fighting, Conspiracy Brother accidentally begins the building's self-destruct sequence. The B.R.O.T.H.E.R.H.O.O.D. cures Boutwell and evacuate him from the building while Undercover Brother chases Mr. Feather to the roof. The Man's helicopter circles overhead and leaves, The Man abandoning Mr. Feather for failing him. Mr. Feather jumps onto the helicopter's landing gear as it flies away, and Undercover Brother uses his afro picks to impale Mr. Feather in the buttocks, causing him to fall into the ocean, where he is eaten by a shark. However, The Man escapes. Undercover Brother survives the building's self-destruction by leaping off the building and using his modified parachute pants to escape. He and Sistah Girl kiss and leave the island, the world at peace.

Cast
 Eddie Griffin as Undercover Brother / Anton Jackson
 Chris Kattan as Mr. Feather
 Denise Richards as White She-Devil / Penelope Snow
 Aunjanue Ellis as Sistah Girl
 Dave Chappelle as Conspiracy Brother Jones
 Chi McBride as The Chief
 Neil Patrick Harris as Lance the Intern
 Gary Anthony Williams as Smart Brother
 Billy Dee Williams as General Warren Boutwell
 Jack Noseworthy as Mr. Elias
 J.D. Hall as The Narrator
 James Brown as himself
 Robert Trumbull as The Man
 Robert Townsend as Mr. U.B.

Filming locations
The R. C. Harris Water Treatment Plant in Toronto served as the headquarters for "The Man".

Music
"Undercova Funk (Give Up the Funk)" by Snoop Dogg featuring Bootsy Collins was released as a single from the film's soundtrack album on Hollywood Records, sampling "Give Up the Funk (Tear the Roof off the Sucker)" by Parliament, from the album Mothership Connection, which was also featured in the film. A music video for "Undercover Funk" was also produced, featuring appearances from Eddie Griffin, Bootsy Collins and Buckethead.

Reception

Box office
Undercover Brother made $12.1 million during its opening weekend, ranking in fourth place at the box office, behind The Sum of All Fears, Star Wars: Episode II – Attack of the Clones and Spider-Man.

Critical response
On Rotten Tomatoes, the film holds an approval rating of 77% based on 130 reviews, with an average rating of 6.8/10. The website's critics consensus reads, "Fast-paced and filled with racial gags, Undercover Brother serves up plenty of laughs and sharp satire." On Metacritic, the film received a weighted average score of 69 out of 100, based on 30 critics, indicating "generally favorable reviews".

Mick LaSalle of the San Francisco Chronicle gave a positive review, stating: "The picture is crammed with shameless satire, engaging moments of pure silliness and jokes that border on the outrageous. It combines relentless energy with an aura of good nature for a formula that works."

Later, Denise Richards said:"That was a fun movie. We had so much fun doing it. It's so camp and silly."

Sequel 

A sequel titled Undercover Brother 2 starring Michael Jai White, Gary Owen, Affion Crockett, and Brandon Hirsch was released on Netflix and directly to video in 2019.

Awards 
 Black Reel - Best Film Song for "Undercova Brother (We Got the Funk)"
 Washington DC Area Film Critics Association Awards - Best Guilty Pleasure

References

External links 

 
 
 
 

2002 films
2002 action comedy films
2000s American films
2000s English-language films
2000s exploitation films
2000s parody films
2000s spy comedy films
African-American comedy films
American action comedy films
American spy comedy films
Blaxploitation films
Films about mind control
Films based on Internet-based works
Films directed by Malcolm D. Lee
Films produced by Brian Grazer
Films scored by Stanley Clarke
Films shot in Toronto
Films with screenplays by John Ridley
Films with screenplays by Michael McCullers
Imagine Entertainment films
Live-action films based on animated series
Parody films based on James Bond films
Universal Pictures films
African-American films